George Henry Boughton  (4 December 1833 – 19 January 1905) was an Anglo-American landscape and genre painter, illustrator and writer.

Life and work
Boughton was born in Norwich in Norfolk, England, the son of farmer William Boughton. The family immigrated to the United States in 1835, and he grew up in Albany, New York where he started his career as a self-taught artist. At this early stage he was influenced by the artists of the Hudson River School. By the age of 19 he was recognised as a landscape painter and opened his first studio in 1852. In 1853, the American Art Union purchased one of his early pictures which financed six months of studying art in England. He concluded this period of his training with a sketching tour of the Lake District, Scotland and Ireland.

After coming back to the USA, Boughton exhibited his works in Washington, D.C. and New York, but in the late 1850s he finally made a decision to move to Europe. From 1859–61 he studied art in France under Pierre Edouard Frère (1819–1886) and Edward Harrison May (1824–1887).

In 1861 Boughton opened a studio in London, and, although living in England, nevertheless focused on subjects of early American Colonial history, and an American critic noticed that "for early history of this country his talents seems to be peculiarly fitted." His subject-pictures, such as the Early Puritans of New England Going to Church (1867), were especially popular. The Return of the Mayflower (shown at the Goupil Gallery, New York in 1871) was praised as "a picture which will live as long as the memory of the Mayflower itself lasts."

Vincent van Gogh, who lived London in 1873–75, was much impressed by Boughton’s painting Godspeed! Pilgrims Setting Out for Canterbury. Then working as a minister, he gave a sermon inspired by the painting, and wrote about it to his brother Theo. The Boughton painting is now part of the collection of the Van Gogh Museum in Amsterdam.

Boughton illustrated Nathaniel Hawthorne’s The Scarlet Letter and  Henry Wadsworth Longfellow's poems. In 1893, the edition of Washington Irving’s Rip Van Winkle and Sleepy Hollow was published in London with 53 illustrations by Boughton (see bibliography).  A London critic once declared that he "has learnt the secret of putting natural feelings into rustic figures, which has been almost entirely wanting to English painters."

Boughton exhibited extensively in both Britain and USA, and was elected a member of the National Academy of Design in New York in 1871. He was elected a member of the Royal Institute of Painters in Water Colours, an Associate of the Royal Academy (ARA) in 1879, and a Royal Academician (RA) in 1896. "He was a useful and popular member of this body, and worked well as member of the council, as a 'hanger', and as a teacher in the schools." After the death of John Callcott Horsley, Boughton was elected a Director of the "Fine Art and General Insurance Company".

Among his landscape paintings - views of England and Brittany in France. In 1883, he travelled to Holland. His illustrated account of that journey was published in the Harper's Magazine as 'Artist Strolls in Holland', and published next year in London as Sketching Rambles in Holland (see bibliography).

Boughton obviously took pleasure in writing: later he would participate in the publication of the 'English Art in the Public Galleries of London' providing the overview of George Morland's biography and work.

Boughton easily socialised in London artistic circles and was a member of the Arts Club (1869–96), of the Reform Club, the Athenaeum Club, the Burlington Fine Arts Club and the Grolier and Lotos Clubs in New York.

In 1865, Boughton married Katherine Louise Cullen (1845-after 1901), and they had an adopted daughter, Florence. Along with John Callcott Horsley, he was one of the early clients of architect Richard Norman Shaw who built a house for the Boughtons on Campden Hill, London. "The parties given here by Mr and Mrs Boughton were celebrated among artistic and literary people and in the Anglo-American section of the society."

It was noticed that Boughton was influenced by works of British painter and illustrator Frederick Walker (1840–1875). In the 1870s in London he met James Whistler. In 1878, an American reviewer praised them as "shining lights in the art world" of London. Boughton published vivid recollections about Whistler, particularly mentioning his work on the famous ‘Peacock Room'. In 1877 he made an acquaintance with Henry James (1843–1916).

The female novelist Violet Hunt (1862–1942) based her novels Their Lives (1916) and Their Hearts (1921) on her early love affair with Boughton. The novel Christina Chard (1894) by Mrs Rosa Campbell-Praed (1851–1935), an Australian novelist, was dedicated to Boughton, because he had suggested the idea of the book.

In the 1880s-1890s, he was associated with several artistic colonies in countryside, namely with the village of Broadway in Worcestershire, the rustic beauty of which was recognised by many American artists. Along with Henry James, Edwin Abbey, John Singer Sargent and others, he frequently visited Broadway. Through Horsley and Shaw he also was associated with the Cranbrook Colony of artists, visiting them in the late 1860s-1880s.

Boughton died of heart disease, on 19 January 1905, in his studio at Campden Hill, north London. His obituary stated that "he was kindly, genial, humorous, a lover of a good story, the essence of hospitality, and wholly free from jealousy, malice, and incharitable judgments."

His paintings are now represented in many museums in the United States and Europe.

Works

References

Further reading
Boughton, George Henry. Sketching rambles in Holland (New York, Harper & Brothers, 1885).
 Records of The Arts Club, London;

Boughton, G. H. 'A Few of the Various Whistlers I have Known' (Studio, vol. 30, December 1903) pp. 208–18.
Baldry, Alfred Lys. G. H. Boughton, R. A. His Life and Work (Virtue & Co, London, 1904).

Paintings and Sculpture in the Collection of the National Academy of Design (New York, 2004. Vol.1) pp. 59–61.

Books Illustrated by Boughton
Irving, Washington. Rip Van Winkle and, The Legend of Sleepy Hollow (London: New York : Macmillan, 1893)
Hawthorne, Nathaniel. The Scarlet Letter (1908)

External links

 
G H Boughton online (ArtCyclopedia)
G H Boughton - short biography (Turak Gallery)
G H Boughton - short biography ("The vault at PFAFFs")
paintings by Boughton  (The Athaenaeum)
G H Boughton pictures (ArtMagick)
Hudson River school visions: the landscapes of Sanford R. Gifford, an exhibition catalog from The Metropolitan Museum of Art (fully available online as PDF), which contains material on Boughton (see index)
 

1833 births
1905 deaths
19th-century American painters
American male painters
20th-century American painters
American genre painters
19th-century English painters
English male painters
20th-century English painters
English illustrators
Royal Academicians
Artists from Norwich
Artists from Albany, New York
English emigrants to the United States
Members of the Royal Institute of Painters in Water Colours
19th-century American male artists
20th-century American male artists
20th-century English male artists
19th-century English male artists